Pteroteinon pruna, Evans' red-eye, is a butterfly in the family Hesperiidae. It is found in Guinea, Sierra Leone, Ivory Coast, Ghana, Nigeria, Cameroon, the Republic of the Congo, the Democratic Republic of the Congo and Uganda. The habitat consists of riverine forests.

References

Butterflies described in 1937
Erionotini